Xenia de la Ossa Osegueda (born 30 June 1958, San José, Costa Rica) is a theoretical physicist whose research focuses on mathematical structures that arise in string theory. She is a professor at Oxford's Mathematical Institute.

Academic career

Xenia de la Ossa received her PhD from University of Texas at Austin with the dissertation Quantum Calabi-Yau Manifolds and Mirror Symmetry written under the supervision of Willy Fischler.

She was at the Institute for Advanced Study from 1993 to 1995.

Xenia de la Ossa is known for her contributions to mathematical physics with much of her work focusing on string theory and its interplay with algebraic geometry. In 1991, she coauthored "A pair of Calabi-Yau manifolds as an exactly soluble superconformal theory", which contained remarkable predictions about the number of rational curves on a quintic threefold. This was the first work to use mirror symmetry in order to make enumerative predictions in algebraic geometry, which moreover went far beyond what could be proved at the time using the available techniques within the area.

This paper was cited in books about string theory. In 2004, Roger Penrose mentioned it in his book The Road to Reality:

The breakthrough enumerative predictions of the de la Ossa et al paper were eventually confirmed for low degrees of the curves (up to 9) and required corrections in higher degree.

Professor de la Ossa has belonged to scientific committees of several organizations for the promotion of scientific events in Latin America, among them the Mesoamerican Centre for Theoretical Physics and the School of Mathematics of Latin America and the Caribbean. She has been elected to the Costa Rican National Academy of Science. She has been invited as speaker to many conferences at academic institutions around the world.

In 2019 she was awarded the Dean’s Distinguished Visiting Professorship by the Fields Institute in Toronto and the Mathematics Department of Toronto University.

She has also been principal investigator for the project entitled Vacuum States of the Heterotic String, supported by a grant from the Engineering and Physical Sciences Research Council (EPSRC).

Personal life

Xenia de la Ossa is married to British physicist and mathematician Philip Candelas and has two daughters.

References 

1958 births
Living people
Costa Rican physicists
Costa Rican women physicists
University of Texas at Austin College of Natural Sciences alumni
Academics of the University of Oxford
20th-century British physicists
20th-century British women scientists
21st-century British physicists
21st-century British women scientists